Stefano Valtulini (born 5 July 1996) is an Italian motorcycle racer. He currently competes in the CIV Supersport Championship aboard a Kawasaki ZX-6R.

Career
Born in Calcinate, Valtulini was a competitor of the Red Bull MotoGP Rookies Cup in 2011.

Career statistics

Grand Prix motorcycle racing

By season

By class

Races by year
(key)

Supersport World Championship

Races by year

References

External links

1996 births
Living people
Italian motorcycle racers
Moto3 World Championship riders
Supersport World Championship riders
People from Calcinate
Sportspeople from the Province of Bergamo
MotoE World Cup riders